The Changi Air Base  is an airfield military airbase of the Republic of Singapore Air Force (RSAF) located at Changi, in the eastern tip of Singapore. Sited at two locations to the east and west of Singapore Changi Airport, it co-shares runway facilities with the civilian airport and currently occupies a third runway slated for future expansion for civilian use by Singapore Changi Airport. Together, the two airfields house 121 Squadron, 112 Squadron, 145 Squadron, the Field Defence Squadron, the Air Logistics Squadron and the Airfield Maintenance Squadron. The air base badge carries the motto Together in Excellence.

History

RAF Changi

The area where Changi Air Base now sits was once a large encampment of British Army artillery and combat engineer units based in Singapore between the mid-1930s up until 1942, when the island fell under Japanese occupation after the British surrender that year. This large encampment, comprising several barracks and military administrative buildings such as Roberts Barrack and Selarang Camp, were used together with the nearby Changi Prison (previously a maximum-security incarceration complex for civilians) for housing many of the Allied prisoners-of-war (POWs) after Japan took over control of Singapore. The construction of the current airfield in Changi Air Base was initiated by the occupying Imperial Japanese Armed Forces using those same Allied POWs imprisoned in the Changi area as forced labourers, building two roughly-paved landing strips between 1943 and 1944, intersecting in a cross-shaped layout and in approximately north–south and east–west directions (similar to what was done at Kallang Airport by Japanese occupation forces) to allow planes to land and takeoff in any possible direction all around. This Japanese-built airfield facility became a Royal Air Force station after the Japanese occupation in Singapore abruptly ended following the Japanese surrender in 1945 and was then renamed as RAF Changi in 1946 by the returning British military authorities. Now, it was the newly imprisoned Japanese troops under British captivity which were then made to improve both runways, reinforcing the north–south runway for military aircraft and adding perforated steel plates on the east–west runway.

Units
 Air Command Far East and Air Headquarters Malaya Communication Squadron RAF
 Air Headquarters Malaya Communication Squadron RAF
 Far East Communication Squadron RAF
 Headquarters Air Command Southeast Asia (Communication) Squadron RAF
 No. 33 Squadron RAF
 No. 48 Squadron RAF
 No. 52 Squadron RAF
 No. 81 Squadron RAF
 No. 84 Squadron RAF
 No. 103 Squadron RAF
 No. 110 Squadron RAF
 No. 205 Squadron RAF
 No. 215 Squadron RAF
 No. 656 Squadron RAF

Completed post-war, non-flying RAF Chia Keng — a GCHQ radio-receiving station, was a satellite station of RAF Changi (being the Headquarters Air component part of British Far East Command) until the withdrawal of British troops from Singapore at the end of the 1960s. Also, the nearby RAF Hospital Changi (now defunct as Changi Hospital and more prominently known as Old Changi Hospital, OCH) functioned as the primary British military hospital which provided medical care for all British, Australian and New Zealand servicemen (collectively, these three Commonwealth states which based troops in Singapore became known by the term "ANZUK", for Australia, New Zealand and the UK) stationed in the eastern and northern parts of Singapore while Alexandra Hospital was directed for those stationed in the southern and western areas of Singapore.

Changi Air Base
Upon the withdrawal of British forces from Singapore, RAF Changi was renamed as Changi Air Base (CAB) and was handed over to the SADC (predecessor of Republic of Singapore Air Force) on 9 December 1971. Thereafter, the airfield received its first flying squadron of SADC – the Alouette Squadron and their Alouette III helicopters shortly after New Year's Day 1972. With the arrival of the first Shorts Skyvans in 1973, SADC began to form the 121 Squadron at Changi Air Base and it is currently the oldest resident squadron of the airfield.

The novel 'The Sound of Pirates' by former RAF airman Terence Brand is based in the 1960s both on the airfield and in the surrounding areas.

Singapore Changi Airport

In June 1975, the Singapore government acquired about two-thirds of the airbase (saved for the main flight-line, hangar/aircraft maintenance facilities and control tower which were located in the western section of the airbase) for the construction of the new Singapore Changi Airport, with the new runways in close alignment with the original north–south runway. The east–west runway was almost erased from the map, currently surviving as a taxiway to the apron area which has remained operational as part of Changi Air Base.

Changi Air Base (West)

Following the opening of the new Changi Air Base (East) (Changi East Complex) on 29 November 2004, the existing facilities at Changi Air Base has been renamed as Changi Air Base (West) (Changi West Complex) and Headquarters Changi Air Base (HQ CAB).

The flying squadrons now are:
 121 Squadron with 4 Utility Transport Aircraft (UTA) and 5 Maritime Patrol Aircraft (MPA) versions of the Fokker F50

The Support Squadrons are:
 Field Defence Squadron (FDS)
 Airfield Maintenance Squadron (AMS)
 Airfield Operations Maintenance Squadron Fixed Wing 2 (AOMS-FW2)
 Ground Logistics Liaison Office / Ground Logistics Squadron (GLLO/GLS)
 Air Movement Centre (AMC)

Changi Air Base (East)

The base was opened on 29 November 2004.

The base was closed for runway reconstruction and reopened at the end of 2018.

The flying squadrons now are:

 145 Squadron with 20 F-16D Block 52+ (Strike)
 112 Squadron with 6 A330 MRTT

Gallery

See also
 Battle of Singapore
 British Far East Command
 Far East Air Force (Royal Air Force)
 Far East Strategic Reserve
 Former overseas RAF bases
 Indonesia–Malaysia confrontation
 Malayan Emergency
 Republic of Singapore Air Force

References

Citations

Bibliography

External links

 RSAF web page on Changi Air Base (CAB)
 News article on new airbase
 Changi International Airport history
 
 
 History of RAF
 Crest Badge and Information of RAF Changi
 Memories of Singapore – RAF Changi

Airports established in 1944
Airports in Singapore
Camps and bases of the Singapore Armed Forces
Air Base
Military of Singapore under British rule
Republic of Singapore Air Force bases
20th-century architecture in Singapore